The Ancash water frog (Telmatobius carrillae) is a species of frog in the family Telmatobiidae.
It is endemic to Peru.
Its natural habitats are subtropical or tropical high-altitude grassland and rivers with stony bottoms and weak currents. This species has been assessed as Vulnerable by the IUCN under criteria B1ab(iii,v), and has an extent of occurrence of 16,946 km2 across the Central Peruvian Andes at altitudes of 3,680–4,818 m asl. All populations occur in different hydrographic systems, and could qualify as being quite fragmented in its distribution, and though not specifically recorded, anthropogenic pressures such as pollution from mining concessions, collection for food and possible chytrid infection.

References

carrillae
Endemic fauna of Peru
Amphibians of Peru
Amphibians of the Andes
Taxonomy articles created by Polbot
Amphibians described in 1988